Axe Murder Boyz, consisting of brothers Mike and James Garcia, who perform under the names Bonez Dubb and Otis, has released four studio albums. They have been signed to Axe Recordings (1999–2004), Canonize Productions (2004–present), Psychopathic Records (2005–2006; 2013–2016), Hatchet House (2008–2011) and Majik Ninja Entertainment (2016–present).

Studio albums

EPs

Mixtapes

Singles

Appearances

Mixtape appearances 

 Canonize: The Mixtape (2008)
 DJ Clay - Let 'Em Bleed: The Mixxtape, Vol. 3 - "Ima Get Mine" (2008)
 DJ Clay - Let 'Em Bleed: The Mixxtape, Vol. 4 - "It's Going Down" (2009)
 DJ Clay - Book of the Wicked, Chapter One - "Fuck The World", "Whoop!" (2010)
 DJ Clay - Book of the Wicked, Chapter Two - "Rock The Axe", "The Disposal" (2010)

Guest appearances

Original contributions to compilations

Solo albums

Otis (Young Wicked)

Young Wicked: The Mixtape Vol. 1 (February 4, 2013) (Canonize Productions)
Slaughter (September 4, 2015) (Psychopathic Records)
Young Wicked: The Mixtape Vol. 2 (2018) (Canonize Productions)

Bonez Dubb  

Show Me The Truth: The Mixtape (2018) (Majik Ninja Entertainment)

Music videos

Solo Music Videos

Young Wicked

Bonez Dubb

References

External links 
 
 Allmusic.com
 Discogs.com

Hip hop discographies